La Maison ensorcelée (literally "The Ensorcelled House" from French, also known as The Witch House) is a 1906 French short film directed by Segundo de Chomón. The film features stop-motion animation and is considered to be one of the earliest cinematic depictions of a haunted house premise.

Plot
Two men and a woman stop at a small house in the woods. Inside, they experience numerous instances of paranormal activity, including disappearing furniture; a stereotypical ghost; movement of cutlery and food on their own; ball lightning; unexplained tilting of the entire home; and a grotesque being with claw-like fingers that attempts to eat the trio.

Legacy
The film inspired director Jennifer Kent, and was included in a scene in her 2014 horror film The Babadook.

References

External links
 

1908 films
1908 horror films
1908 animated films
1900s ghost films
Films directed by Segundo de Chomón
French horror films
French silent short films
Articles containing video clips
French black-and-white films
Films using stop-motion animation
1908 short films
Silent horror films